Ali Faidh Atashi (Arabic:علي فيض إتشي) (born 24 December 1996) is Qatari footballer who plays as a defender for Mesaimeer.

External links
 

Qatari footballers
1996 births
Living people
Mesaimeer SC players
Al Sadd SC players
Al Ahli SC (Doha) players
Qatar Stars League players
Qatari Second Division players
Association football defenders